Sebba is a town located in the province of Yagha in Burkina Faso. It is the capital of Yagha Province.

The mayor of Sebba is Hama Amirou Ly, of the Party for Democracy and Socialism.

References

Yagha Province
Populated places in the Sahel Region